The Peabody Central Fire Station is a historic fire station at 41 Lowell Street in Peabody, Massachusetts, United States. Built in 1873, the two story brick building is one of the oldest active fire stations in the state.  The building has Victorian styling, with a mansard roof, and two truncated gables on its front facade.  The cornice is studded with regularly spaced brackets, and a tower rises from the building's rear right corner.

The building was listed on the National Register of Historic Places in 1979.

See also
National Register of Historic Places listings in Essex County, Massachusetts

References

Fire stations completed in 1873
Fire stations on the National Register of Historic Places in Massachusetts
Buildings and structures in Peabody, Massachusetts
National Register of Historic Places in Essex County, Massachusetts
History of Peabody, Massachusetts